Acylita cara is a species of moth of the family Noctuidae first described by William Schaus in 1894. It is found in Brazil. Its wingspan is about 28 mm.

Description
The head, thorax, and abdomen are white and slightly tinged with rufous. The forelegs brownish, and the forewings are white and irrorated (sprinkled) with crimson. A bright rufous fascia extends from close to the base through the cell to apex narrowing to points at extremities and defined above and below by white streaks. A slight oblique red fascia extends from termen just below apex to vein 1 beyond the middle. There is a fine red terminal line. Hindwings are white very faintly tinged with brown; the underside irrorated with crimson, strongly on costal area.

References

Hadeninae
Moths of South America
Moths described in 1894